Machinarium is a puzzle point-and-click adventure game developed by Amanita Design. It was released on 16 October 2009 for Microsoft Windows, OS X, Linux, on 8 September 2011 for iPad 2 on the App Store, on 21 November 2011 for BlackBerry PlayBook, on 10 May 2012 for Android, on 6 September 2012 on PlayStation 3's PlayStation Network in Europe, on 9 October 2012 in North America and on 18 October 2012 in Asia, and was also released for PlayStation Vita on 26 March 2013 in North America, on 1 May 2013 in Europe and on 7 May 2013 in Asia. Demos for Windows, Mac and Linux were made available on 30 September 2009. A future release for the Wii's WiiWare service was cancelled  due to WiiWare's 40MB limit.

Microsoft Windows, OS X, Linux and Android versions of this game were released along with Humble Indie Bundle for Android 4 on 8 November 2012, to customers who paid over the average price. The Windows Phone version was released on 22 March 2014. 
In 2017, the developer released a Definitive Version of the game that is based on a DirectX engine instead of Adobe Flash and can be played in full-screen mode. The Xbox One version of the game was released on 16 April 2020.

Gameplay

The goal of Machinarium is to solve a series of puzzles and brain teasers. The puzzles are linked together by an overworld consisting of a traditional "point and click" adventure story. The overworld's most radical departure is that only objects within the player character's reach can be clicked on.

Machinarium is notable in that it contains no dialogue, spoken or written, and apart from a few tutorial prompts on the first screen, is devoid of understandable language entirely. The game instead uses a system of animated thought bubbles. Easter egg backstory scenes in the same format can only be revealed by idling in certain areas.

The game employs a two-tier hint system. Once per level, the player can receive a hint, which becomes increasingly vague as the game progresses. Machinarium also comes with a walkthrough, that can be accessed at any time by playing a minigame. As with dialogue, the walkthrough is not in written or spoken form, but instead a series of sketches describing the puzzle at hand and its solution. However, the walkthrough only reveals what must be done in that area, and not how that puzzle relates to the game chronology.

Plot summary
Machinarium opens with an overview of the eponymous city as a disposal flier launches from the pinnacle of its highest tower.  The player character, a robot called Josef (named after Josef Čapek, the creator of the word "robot" and brother to Karel Čapek) is dumped on a scrapheap, where he re-assembles himself and sets off for the city. Entering the city, he discovers a plot by the Black Cap Brotherhood, the three criminal antagonists, to blow up the city's tower. He is himself then discovered and locked up.  After breaking out of prison, Josef aids the citizens of the city, as he discovers the mischief which the Brotherhood has been working.  Shortly after flooding the Brotherhood's room (leaving them helpless), Josef locates his girlfriend Berta, who has been locked up and forced to cook. Unable to free her, he works his way to the top of the tower. After he foils the Black Cap Brotherhood's plot by disarming the bomb taped to the tower, Josef reaches the highest room, in which the story began.  A huge-headed robot, the "head" of the city, sits in the middle of the room, incapacitated and gibbering. Josef recalls how the three of them lived happily until the Black Cap Brotherhood zapped this friend, leaving him disabled, and kidnapped Berta. When a garbage sucker arrived to dispose of the Black Cap thug, it apprehended Josef instead.  After this revelation, Josef restores his friend to sanity, dumps the Brotherhood down a drain, and frees Berta. The two of them climb back to the tower, wave goodbye to their friend, and fly off into the sunset.  In the final closing scene, their vehicle suffers a collision and falls, and they are seen being carried away separately by two fliers.

Development
Machinarium was developed over a period of three years, by seven Czech developers, who financed the project with their own savings. The marketing budget for the game was $1,000.

The game was in development for the Xbox 360 platform for a period of six months; however, Microsoft, whom the developers had approached to publish the title on Xbox Live Arcade, ultimately decided not to do so. Microsoft does not allow games to be released on Xbox Live Arcade without a publisher attached to the title, and the developers were reluctant to approach a third party to publish the game, as this would mean that profits for the developers from sales over Xbox Live Arcade would be greatly reduced. Subsequently, Amanita Design approached Sony, whose policies do allow for self-publishing on the PlayStation Network platform, and have submitted the game to them for approval, in order to release the game on the PlayStation Network.

In 2011 it was mentioned that a sequel to Machinarium "is possible" but something the team has yet to fully consider. "We don't look far through the future", said Jakub Dvorský.

Reception

Critical response
Machinarium was well-received on release; on the critic aggregate sites GameRankings and Metacritic, the game has an average score of 85% and 85/100, respectively.

In 2008, it won the Aesthetics award at IndieCade (the International Festival of Independent Games). It won the Excellence in Visual Art award at the 12th Annual Independent Games Festival and the Best Soundtrack award from PC Gamer in 2009. It was nominated for an Outstanding Achievement in Art Direction award by the Academy of Interactive Arts & Sciences and a Milthon award in the 'Best Indie Game' category at the Paris Game Festival.

Gaming site Kotaku named it a runner-up for "PC Game of the Year 2009" alongside Torchlight, losing to winner Empire: Total War. Gamasutra, Gamerview and the Turkish site of Tom's Hardware all selected Machinarium as the 'Best Indie Game' of 2009. AceGamez named Machinarium the 'Best Traditional Adventure Game' of 2009.

In 2011, Adventure Gamers named Machinarium the 17th-best adventure game ever released.

Pirate amnesty
On 5 August 2010, Amanita Design announced that according to their estimates, only 5–15% of Machinarium players had actually paid for the game. In an effort to increase sales, the game's price was lowered from the regular $20 to $5 until 12 August as an incentive for pirates to purchase the game legally. The campaign was later extended until 16 August, resulting in 20,000 game copies sold over the whole amnesty period.

Sales
Machinarium has sold over 4 million units  from which 49% is for PC, 44% mobile devices and 7% consoles.

Editions

Machinarium was released in several physical and digital formats.

 Physical:
 Machinarium Collector's Edition (United Kingdom) – includes a DVD with the game, a soundtrack in digital format, a CD with the soundtrack, a printed walkthrough, an A3 poster and concept art. Systems: Windows, Mac (no Linux).
 Mашинариум (Machinarium) (Russian Edition) – includes a DVD with the game and a CD with the soundtrack. Systems: Windows, Mac (no Linux).
 Machinarium (German Edition) – includes a game disc, a CD with the soundtrack, Samorost 2 and a poster. Systems: Windows, Mac (no Linux).
 Machinarium (French Edition) – includes a game disc, a CD with the soundtrack, Samorost 2 and a poster. Systems: Windows, Mac (no Linux).
 Machinarium (Italian Edition) – includes a game disc. Systems: Windows (no Mac, no Linux).
 Machinarium (Czech Edition) – includes a game disc and an MP3 soundtrack. Systems: Windows, Mac (no Linux).
 Machinarium (Slovak Edition) – includes a game disc and an MP3 soundtrack. Systems: Windows, Mac (no Linux).
 Machinarium (Polish Edition) – includes a DVD with the game, a soundtrack, an EP album in FLAC/MP3 digital formats and a poster. Systems: Windows, Mac. Packed in an "exclusive", metal box.

 Digital:
 Amanita Design Store – includes Win, Mac and Linux versions of the game and a soundtrack in FLAC/MP3 format. It was released on 16 October 2009.
 Steam – includes Win and Mac versions of the game. It was released on 16 October 2009.
 GOG.com – "Machinarium: Collector's Edition" includes Win, Mac and Linux versions of the game, a soundtrack, and various artwork and supplemental materials.
 Desura – includes Win, Mac and Linux versions of the game and a soundtrack. It was released on 19 December 2010 in conjunction with Humble Indie Bundle 2.
 Impulse – includes a Win version of the game.
 Direct2Drive – includes a Win version of the game.
 GamersGate – includes Win and Mac versions of the game.
 Mac App Store – includes a Mac version of the game. It was released on 18 March 2011.
 Playism (Japan) – includes Win and Mac versions of the game. It was released on 11 May 2011.

 Consoles:
 PlayStation 3 (PSN) (as Ultimate Version) – released on 6 September 2012 in Europe, 9 October 2012 in North America and 18 October 2012 in Asia.

 Cancelled:
 Xbox 360 (XBLA) – the game was in development for the Xbox 360 platform for a period of six months; however, Microsoft, whom the developers had approached to publish the title on Xbox Live Arcade, ultimately decided not to do so.
 Wii (WiiWare) – the game was being scheduled for a release for the Nintendo Wii's WiiWare service, but , it has been cancelled due to WiiWare's 40MB limit.

 Handheld game consoles:
 PlayStation Vita – released on 26 March 2013 in North America, on 1 May 2013 in Europe and on 7 May 2013 in Asia.

 Tablets:
 iPad 2 – released on 8 September 2011.
 BlackBerry PlayBook – released on 21 November 2011.
 Android – released on 10 May 2012.
 iPad 1 – released as v2.0 on 16 October 2013.

 Natively runs on another platforms:
 HP TouchPad – natively runs on the Flash-based PC version.

Other media
Josef has been featured as a playable character in the platform game Super Meat Boy, and makes a cameo in the puzzle game ilomilo.

Josef was also included in the Video Game Character alphabet, created by Fabian Gonzalez.

Josef also made a cameo in Amanita Design's second full-scale game, Botanicula.

Machinarium and its soundtrack inspired the poem The Machingeon, written by Andrew Galan and published in Establishment Magazine Issue 1.

Josef is included in the "Good Friends" Character DLC pack for Runner2.

Josef is featured as an assist character in the upcoming fighting game Fraymakers.

In 2019, Tomáš Dvořák, the soundtrack composer for Machinarium better known under his pseudonym Floex,  was performing live shows with a robotic version of Josef who plays various beat instruments. The performance itself consists of reworks of the soundtrack.

See also
 Video games in the Czech Republic
Art game
Gobliiins
The Humble Indie Bundle

References

External links
Official site with online Flash demo

2009 video games
Android (operating system) games
Adventure games
Amanita Design games
Art games
BlackBerry PlayBook games
Cancelled Xbox 360 games
Cancelled Wii games
Flash games
Independent Games Festival winners
Indie video games
Linux games
MacOS games
PlayStation 3 games
PlayStation 4 games
PlayStation Network games
PlayStation Vita games
Point-and-click adventure games
Puzzle video games
Single-player video games
Steampunk video games
Video games developed in the Czech Republic
Windows games
Video games about robots
Nintendo Switch games
IOS games